C. K. Chandrappan (10 November 1935 – 22 March 2012) was a politician from Kerala, India. He was the Kerala state secretary of the Communist Party of India (CPI) and the president of All India Kisan Sabha at the time of his death. He was a member of the Lok Sabha of India representing the Thalassery (Lok Sabha constituency) from 1971 to 1977, Kannur (Lok Sabha constituency) from 1977 to 1980 and Thrissur (Lok Sabha constituency) from 2004 to 2009. Chandrappan served as Member of the Legislative Assembly of Kerala from 1991 to 1996 representing Chertala.

Political life
Chandrappan started his political life when he was a member of leftist youth federations in the 1970s. He took part in the Goa liberation movement and was jailed as a political prisoner on various occasions in Delhi, Kolkata and Thiruvananthapuram.

Death
C. K. Chandrappan died in Thiruvananthapuram on 22 March 2012 at the age of 76, due to cancer.

References

External links

 Members of Fourteenth Lok Sabha - Parliament of India website

People from Alappuzha district
2012 deaths
1935 births
India MPs 2004–2009
Communist Party of India politicians from Kerala
India MPs 1977–1979
India MPs 1971–1977
Lok Sabha members from Kerala
Kerala MLAs 1991–1996